Pijush Saha is an Indian film director, producer and writer from Kolkata. The first feature he directed was Satrur Mukabela (2002), which was followed by Kartabya (2003)  Tulkalam (2007)  Bajimat (2008) Neel Akasher Chandni (2009) Kellafate(2010) and Beparoyaa (2016).

Filmography
As a director, writer and producer, Pijush Saha worked in the following Bengali films:

Awards

Hero Honda 68th BFJA Awards for best clean & entertaining film Gerakal in 2005
Kalakar Awards in Best Bengali Film category for the film Kellafate in 2010
Kalakar Awards in Best Bengali Film category for the film Neel Akasher Chandni on 17 January 2010

References

External links

Film directors from Kolkata
Film producers from Kolkata
1970 births
Living people
Bengali film producers
Bengali film directors
21st-century Indian film directors